Magdalena Schröder (born 20 September 1990) is a Swedish Moderate Party politician who was a Member of the Riksdag from 2018 until 2022.

Family 
She is the granddaughter of the former Member of Parliament Margó Ingvardsson, who sat in the Riksdag for the then Left Party Communists between the years 1983 and 1991.

References 

Living people

1990 births
Members of the Riksdag from the Moderate Party
21st-century Swedish women politicians
21st-century Swedish politicians
Women members of the Riksdag
Members of the Riksdag 2018–2022
Politicians from Stockholm
Members of the Riksdag 2022–2026